Ophiogomphus, commonly known as snaketails, is a genus of dragonflies in the family Gomphidae. Most of the species in the genus Ophiogomphus have beautifully marked green club-shaped abdomens, which are more noticeable in the males.

The genus contains the following species:
Ophiogomphus acuminatus  – acuminate snaketail
Ophiogomphus anomalus  – extra-striped snaketail
Ophiogomphus arizonicus  – Arizona snaketail
Ophiogomphus aspersus  – brook snaketail
Ophiogomphus australis  – southern snaketail
Ophiogomphus bellicosus 
Ophiogomphus bison  – bison snaketail
Ophiogomphus carolus  – riffle snaketail
Ophiogomphus caudoforcipus 
Ophiogomphus cecilia  – green snaketail, green gomphid
Ophiogomphus cerastis 
Ophiogomphus colubrinus  – boreal snaketail
Ophiogomphus edmundo  – Edmund's snaketail
Ophiogomphus howei  – pygmy snaketail
Ophiogomphus incurvatus  – Appalachian snaketail
Ophiogomphus mainensis  – Maine snaketail
Ophiogomphus morrisoni  – Great Basin snaketail
Ophiogomphus obscurus 
Ophiogomphus occidentis  – Sinuous snaketail
Ophiogomphus purepecha 
Ophiogomphus reductus 
Ophiogomphus rupinsulensis  – rusty snaketail
Ophiogomphus severus  – pale snaketail
Ophiogomphus sinicus 
Ophiogomphus smithi  – Sioux snaketail
Ophiogomphus spinicornis 
Ophiogomphus susbehcha  – St. Croix snaketail
Ophiogomphus westfalli  – Westfall's snaketail

References

 
Gomphidae
Anisoptera genera
Taxa named by Edmond de Sélys Longchamps
Taxonomy articles created by Polbot